Aşağı Ləki (also, Ashagy Lyaki) is a village and municipality in the Agdash Rayon of Azerbaijan. It has a population of 2,339. The municipality consists of the villages of Aşağı Ləki, Hapıtlı, and Ovçulu.

References 

Populated places in Agdash District